Kotahena East Grama Niladhari Division is a Grama Niladhari Division of the Colombo Divisional Secretariat of Colombo District of Western Province, Sri Lanka.

St. Benedict's College, Colombo, St. Lucia's College, Colombo, Roman Catholic Archdiocese of Colombo, St. Lucia's Cathedral, Sugathadasa Stadium, Colombo Port Power Station, Bloemendhal, Kotahena, St. Thomas' Church, Colombo and St. Anthony's Shrine, Kochchikade are located within, nearby or associated with Kotahena East.

Kotahena East is a surrounded by the New Bazaar, Masangasweediya, Bloemendhal, Kotahena West and Lunupokuna Grama Niladhari Divisions.

Demographics

Ethnicity 

The Kotahena East Grama Niladhari Division has a Sri Lankan Tamil majority (76.1%) and a significant Sinhalese population (16.0%). In comparison, the Colombo Divisional Secretariat (which contains the Kotahena East Grama Niladhari Division) has a Moor plurality (40.1%), a significant Sri Lankan Tamil population (31.1%) and a significant Sinhalese population (25.0%)

Religion 

The Kotahena East Grama Niladhari Division has a Hindu majority (52.7%), a significant Roman Catholic population (29.5%) and a significant Buddhist population (10.8%). In comparison, the Colombo Divisional Secretariat (which contains the Kotahena East Grama Niladhari Division) has a Muslim plurality (41.8%), a significant Hindu population (22.7%), a significant Buddhist population (19.0%) and a significant Roman Catholic population (13.1%)

Gallery

References 

Grama Niladhari Divisions of Colombo Divisional Secretariat